Jeff Ellis (born 16 July 1984)  is an American recording engineer and mix engineer.  His most notable work was featured on both of Frank Ocean's critically acclaimed albums: Channel Orange, and Blonde.

Career 

In 2009, after changing careers from finance to music, Ellis garnered an internship at EastWest Studios, formerly United/Western Recorders, where artists such as Frank Sinatra and The Beach Boys once recorded. When his internship ended, Ellis was asked to join the staff as an assistant musical engineer.

In 2012, Ellis became the engineer for recording artist Frank Ocean when he arrived at EastWest Studios to record a track for his debut album, Channel Orange.  Ellis developed a working relationship with Ocean and was offered the opportunity to freelance full-time on the remainder of the project.  Channel Orange was a critical success, earning Ellis a 2013 Grammy for Best Urban Contemporary Album, as well as a nomination for Album of the Year.  The album also includes the Record Of The Year-nominated track "Thinkin Bout You" a song that Ellis mixed.

Ellis continued to work with Frank Ocean from 2012 to 2016 on his follow up album Blonde. Ellis has also worked with such notable artists such as Akon, Skylar Grey, Nick Jonas, Pernille Rosendahl and Kate Nash, whose album Made of Bricks hit #1 on the UK album chart in 2007.

Awards and nominations

Notable credits

References 

1984 births
Living people
American audio engineers
Grammy Award winners